Cosmopterosis is a genus of moths of the family Crambidae.

Species
Cosmopterosis hispida Solis in Solis, Metz & Janzen, 2009
Cosmopterosis jasonhalli Solis in Solis, Metz & Janzen, 2009
Cosmopterosis spatha Solis in Solis, Metz & Janzen, 2009
Cosmopterosis thetysalis (Walker, 1859)

References

Glaphyriinae
Taxa named by Hans Georg Amsel
Crambidae genera